Prifti is the Albanian word for "the priest". It is found as a surname used by Orthodox Christians in Albania, and in Greece, where it is written Priftis. It may refer to:

People
Albi Prifti (born 1993), Albanian footballer
Andi Prifti (born 1988), Albanian footballer
Dimitri-Erind Prifti (born 1991), Greek footballer
 (1968–2017), Albanian politician
Erind Prifti (born 1991), Albanian footballer
Mihal Prifti (1918–1996), Albanian Communist politician

Toponyms
Prifti, Montenegro

Albanian-language surnames
Occupational surnames